Amaurobius jugorum is a species of spider in the family Amaurobiidae, found in Europe.

References

jugorum
Spiders of Europe
Spiders described in 1868